The 2017 Karachi stabbings were series of attacks carried out by an anonymous person against women in Karachi, Sindh, Pakistan. The spree started on 25 September 2017 and in result 16 women were injured; none of them was robbed or killed by him.

Attacks
The stabber first injured three female citizens on 25 September. He then injured two more on 26 September, and another on 28 September. The affected area was said to be from Johar Chowrangi to Pehlwan Goth between Habib University and Rado Bakery, and the victims were brought to nearby hospital; Darus Sehat, Gulistan-e-Johar.

On 4 October, five women were wounded in the areas from Gulshan-e-Jamal to Gulshan Chowrangi, within three hours. On 16 October, a girl was stabbed near Federal B. Area.

Some women remained either untraceable, or were approached by the local police station, but they refused to file complaints. According to the information, 16 female citizens had fallen victim until.

Perpetrator
The attacks were done by the same person under same dressing. As reported by some victims and seen in CCTV footages, the suspect appears to be a thin man, with 5′ 7–9″ height and aged 20–29. He is clad, wearing black T-shirt and jeans with a bag. He rides a red motorcycle wearing a helmet, and attacks from behind a woman with his left hand using a sharp object and rides away. One of the victims saw him without wearing a helmet, who told he has curly hair and a light shave. He was also said to be suffering from psychological disorder.

The CCTV clips were of poor-quality that they didn't aid in the investigation. The attacker's face and bike's number plate were extremely hard to figure out. All the survivors were "decently attired", so involvement of terrorists in the attacks is not suspected by the police.

Aftermath
These attacks spread panic and fear, forcing many women to stay in home. Soon, high alert security was sent to patrol the areas and investigate throughout.

Following this, the female students at University of Karachi demanded additional security and consequently their attendance was low. They were advised to use point busses instead of using public transport, and the use of helmet was banned while riding a bike within the university premises. A police team too visited the university to validate reports of attacks on women campus, however, Vice Chancellor Prof. Dr. Muhammad Ajmal Khan rejected the reports.

Reactions
On 13 October, police produced Shahzad in the court, saying that he is close to the suspect. On 15 October, Sahiwal police arrested suspect Waseem from Mandi Bahauddin with the help of a team of Karachi police, who was said to be behind the similar knife attacks in Chichawatni area, where 50 women were injured within three years since 2013. Though, after another attack on 16 October in Karachi, it resulted in stating that he might not be involved in Karachi attacks as he never visited. So, Punjab police wanted to interrogate him for similar attacks in Sahiwal, Rawalpindi and Lahore. However, on 14 November, all five cases against Shahzad were closed and he was set free due to lack of evidence.

References

2017 crimes in Pakistan
2010s in Karachi
September 2017 crimes in Asia
September 2017 events in Pakistan
October 2017 crimes in Asia
October 2017 events in Pakistan
Stabbing attacks in 2017
Violence against women in Pakistan